Dmytro Pavlychko (28 September 1929 – 29 January 2023) was a Ukrainian poet, translator, scriptwriter, culturologist, political and public figure.

Biography 
Dmytro Pavlychko was born on 28 September 1929 in a lumber worker family living in the village of Stopchativ near the Carpathian Mountains. Today this place is near the town of Yabluniv in Kosiv Raion, Ivano-Frankivsk Oblast. Between 1945 and 1946 he spent about 12 months in Soviet prison for alleged accusations of participation in UPA activities. There he celebrated his 16th birthday. Later Andriy Malyshko teasingly called Pavlychko a "Banderovite broth cook".<ref>Gold, M. Ukraine will not return into the Empire (Украина не вернется в империю) . Jewish Panorama.</ref>

In 1953 Pavlychko graduated from Lviv University (Department of Philology), worked in "Zhovten" (now, "Dzvin") Magazine. After coming later to Kyiv he worked in the office of the Writer's Union of Ukraine and in 1971–1978 as an editor at "Vsesvit" ("Universe") Magazine.

In his poetry works of Soviet period, first of which ("Love and hatred") was published in 1953, Pavlychko presented himself as publicist and civil activist, though constrained by that time censorship and compromising with existing rules. For that literary work he was awarded the Shevchenko National Prize in 1977.

Besides writing his own verses, he translated into Ukrainian language the poems of Dante Alighieri, Francesco Petrarca, Michelangelo, William Shakespeare, José Martí, Nikola Vaptsarov etc.

Many of Pavlychko's poems were used for songs, most popular and famous of which is "Dva Koliory" ("Two colours").

In late 80-s Dmytro Pavlychko was one of the founders of People's Movement of Ukraine, participated in the renewal of "Prosvita" Society as well as taking an active part in the elaboration of the Act on Independence of Ukraine which was approved on 24 August 1991. In 90-s Pavlychko was the Ambassador of Ukraine to Poland and Slovakia. Pavlychko was elected to the Ukrainian parliament in 1990–1999, 2005

Pavlychko was an honorary Doctor of Science of Lviv and Warsaw Universities, professor of Kyiv-Mohyla Academy, the Hero of Ukraine.

Pavlychko died on 29 January 2023 in Kyiv at the age of 93 and was buried on 31 January in his native village Stopchativ.

 Awards 
 Antonovych prize (2004)

 Published works 
 Lyubov i nenavist ("Love and hatred"), 1953.
 Moya zemlya ("My land"), 1953.
 Chorna nytka ("Black thread"), 1958.
 Pravda klyche ("Truth is calling"), 1958.
 Granoslov, 1968.
 Sonety podilskoy oseny ("Podillian autumn sonnets"), 1973.
 Taemnytsya tvogo oblychchia ("Mystery of your face"), 1974, 1979.
 Magistralyamy slova ("Through word's highways"), literary criticism, 1978.
 Nad glybynamy ("Upon the depths"), literary criticism, 1984.
 Spiral, 1984.
 Poemy i pritchi ("Poems and parables"), 1986.
 Bilya muzhniogo slova ("Next to the courageous word"), literary criticism, 1988.
 Pokayanni psalmy ("Repentance psalms"), 1994.
 World sonnets (translation), 1983.

His books
 Dmytro Vasylovych Pavlychko. (2004). Ukrainska Natsionalna Ideia : Statti, Vystupy, Interv'iu, Dokumenty, Vyd-vo Solomii Pavlychko Osnovy. .
 Dmytro Vasylovych Pavlychko. (2002). Naperstok : Poezii, Vyd-vo Solomii Pavlychko Osnovy. .
 Dmytro Vasylovych Pavlychko. (2002). Ukrainska Natsionalna Ideia, Vydavnychyi dim KM Akademiia. .
 Dmytro Vasylovych Pavlychko. (1988). Bilia Muzhnoho Svitla : Literaturno-Krytychni Statti, Spohady, Vystupy'', Rad. pysmennyk. .

References

External links 
 Poems of Dmytro Pavlychko in the Library of Ukrainian Poetry 
 Poems of Dmytro Pavlychko 
 Dmytro Pavlychko

1929 births
2023 deaths
People from Ivano-Frankivsk Oblast
People from Stanisławów Voivodeship
Ukrainian Insurgent Army
20th-century Ukrainian poets
Translators of William Shakespeare
Soviet dissidents
Ukrainian dissidents
Ukrainian male poets
Ukrainian public relations people
Ukrainian ethnographers
Ukrainian screenwriters
Ukrainian prisoners and detainees
Prisoners and detainees of the Soviet Union
People convicted in relations with the Organization of Ukrainian Nationalists
Members of the Congress of People's Deputies of the Soviet Union
People's Movement of Ukraine politicians
First convocation members of the Verkhovna Rada
Ambassadors of Ukraine to Poland
Ambassadors of Ukraine to Slovakia
Third convocation members of the Verkhovna Rada
Fourth convocation members of the Verkhovna Rada
Recipients of the title of Hero of Ukraine
Recipients of the Shevchenko National Prize
Recipients of the Order of Prince Yaroslav the Wise, 4th class
Recipients of the Order of Prince Yaroslav the Wise, 5th class
Recipients of the Order of Merit (Ukraine), 3rd class
Prosvita